KCKS-LD, virtual channel 25 (UHF digital channel 19), is a low-powered Buzzr-affiliated television station licensed to Kansas City, Kansas, United States. The station is owned by Heartland Broadcasting, LLC.

KCKS-LD, branded as tv25.tv, simulcasts its programming and commercials on two sister stations WROB-LD in Topeka and KMJC-LD in Louisburg, Kansas.

History
On December 13, 2011, the station was granted a license with the call sign of K25NA-D. The station changed its call sign to KCKS-LD on January 17, 2014.

Luken Communications made a pair of affiliation deals with Heartland Broadcasting in 2015. On July 28, 2015, KCKS launched on its .4 subchannel the Heartland network. The second deal was for Rev’n and Retro TV to appear on subchannels .7 and .9 respectively.

Digital television

The station's digital signal is multiplexed:

Translator

References

External links
 

Television stations in Kansas
Buzzr affiliates
True Crime Network affiliates
WeatherNation TV affiliates
Retro TV affiliates
Television channels and stations established in 2014
Low-power television stations in the United States
2014 establishments in Kansas
NewsNet affiliates